The Samsung NX20 is a digital compact camera produced and marketed by Samsung since April 2012 as a successor to the Samsung NX11. It is a 20.3 Megapixel mirrorless interchangeable lens camera using the Samsung NX-mount.

The NX20 is comparable in weight and size with cameras such as the Sony NEX, Nikon 1 and the Micro Four Thirds series of cameras.

The NX20 includes the i-Function lens control system and a built-in WiFi for connection to online services such as email and social networking.

Samsung NX30
The NX30 is similar to its predecessor, the Samsung NX20, but has fast hybrid autofocus which Samsung claims can detect an object in only 80ms.

In addition to this advanced phase-detect/contrast-detect hybrid autofocus system, but it has improved ISO range, better continuous shooting speed (8 vs 9 fps), Full HD videos @ 60fps (NX20 being limited to 30fps only), a higher resolution display and tiltable viewfinder.

See also
 Samsung NX series

References

External links 
 Samsung NX20 Product Page

NX20
Live-preview digital cameras